Ranjit Singh Talwandi is an Indian politician and Secretary General of Shiromani Akali Dal (Sanyukt). He served as Member of the Punjab Legislative Assembly from Raikot (2002-2007). He is son of Jagdev Singh Talwandi, former president of Shiromani Gurdwara Parbandhak Committee and Shiromani Akali Dal.

Personal life 
Talwandi was born in 1956, to father Jagdev Singh Talwandi and mother Mohinder Kaur. He has three siblings, including SGPC member Jagjit Singh Talwandi and Shiromai Akali Dal (Sanyukt) Women's Wing President Harjit Kaur Talwandi. His son Jagteshwar Singh died in a car accident in 2015.

Political career 
Talwandi contested his first election in 1997 from Raikot, and was elected in 2002 from same constituency. He also served as Chairman of  Punjab Small Industries and Exports Corporation (PSIEC). In 2017, during campaigning for assembly elections, former Deputy Minister of Punjab Sukhbir Singh Badal promised ministry to Talwandi at a rally in Khanna. In July 2020, he joined Shiromani Akali Dal (Democratic), which later merged into Shiromani Akali Dal (Sanyukt). In September 2021, he was appointed secretary general of the party. In October 2021, Talwandi was detained by UP Police, who left for Lakhimpur Kheri.

External links

References 

1956 births
Living people
Indian politicians
Indian Sikhs
Punjab, India MLAs 2002–2007
People from Raikot
Members of the Punjab Legislative Assembly
Sikh politics
Punjabi people
21st-century Indian politicians
Shiromani Akali Dal politicians